Greg Abbott (born 1957) is the 48th governor of Texas.

Greg Abbott is also the name of:
Greg Abbott (footballer) (born 1963), English football manager and former player
Reverend Gadget or Greg Abbott, steel fabrication artist, craftsman, prop builder and television personality

See also
Gregory Abbott (born 1954), American soul musician, singer, composer and producer
Gregory Abbott (1900–1981), announcer for Paramount News